Edward Hogue Funston (September 16, 1836 – September 10, 1911) was a U.S. Representative from Kansas.

Biography
Funston was born near New Carlisle, Ohio on September 16, 1836.  He attended the country schools of New Carlisle, Linden Hill Academy in Carlisle, and Marietta College.

He taught school, and during the Civil War entered the Union Army in 1861 as lieutenant in the Sixteenth Ohio Battery. He participated in the principal engagements along the Mississippi River and mustered out in 1865.

He moved to a farm in Carlyle, Kansas in 1867.  Funston served as member of the Kansas House of Representatives (1873–1876) and was Speaker in 1875.  He served in the Kansas Senate (1880–1884), and was Senate President in 1880.

Funston was elected as a Republican to the Forty-eighth Congress to fill the vacancy caused by the death of Dudley C. Haskell. He was reelected to the Forty-ninth and to the three succeeding Congresses and served from March 21, 1884, to March 3, 1893. He served as chairman of the Agriculture Committee (Fifty-first Congress).

He presented credentials as a Member-elect to the Fifty-third Congress and served from March 4, 1893 until August 2, 1894, when he was succeeded by Horace L. Moore, who successfully contested the election. After leaving Congress, Funston returned to his Kansas farm.

He died at his home in Iola, Kansas, on September 10, 1911,  and was interred in Iola Cemetery.

Family
In 1861, Funston married 18-year-old Ann Eliza Mitchell of West Charleston, Ohio; she was a cousin of his Civil War battery commander and a great-grandniece of Daniel Boone.  Their children included: Frederick; James Burton; Pogue Warwick; Ella (Eckdall); Aldo; and Edward H. Jr.  They were also the parents of two other children, a boy and a girl, who died in infancy.

Frederick Funston went on to become a major general in the United States Army and was a recipient of the Medal of Honor.

References

Sources

Books

Newspapers

Internet

External links
  Retrieved on 2008-10-10

See also

1836 births
1911 deaths
Republican Party members of the Kansas House of Representatives
Republican Party Kansas state senators
People of Ohio in the American Civil War
Union Army officers
People from New Carlisle, Ohio
People from Iola, Kansas
Republican Party members of the United States House of Representatives from Kansas
Marietta College alumni
19th-century American politicians